Year 1315 (MCCCXV) was a common year starting on Wednesday (link will display the full calendar) of the Julian calendar.

Events 
 By place 

 Europe 
 Spring – Great Famine of 1315–1317: A famine and pestilence sweeps over Europe, and exacts so frightful a toll of human life that the phenomenon is to be regarded as one of the most impressive features of the period. It covers almost the whole of Northern Europe; the current territory of Ireland, England, France, Netherlands, Germany and Poland. The adverse weather conditions, the ensuing crop failures, and the sharp rise in food prices cause an acute shortage of food that will last for two years. The famine causes millions of deaths (according to estimates, around 10 to 25% of the urban population dies).
 August 19 – King Louis X (the Quarrelsome) marries the 22-year-old Clementia of Hungary (or Clemence), daughter of Charles Martel of Anjou (titular king of Hungary). He and his second wife are five days later crowned at Reims. Louis becomes the 12th Capetian ruler of France. After his coronation, he passes the throne of Navarre to his younger brother, Philip II (the Tall).
 August – Louis X (the Quarrelsome) issues a charter in which he allows the Jews to come back to France. They are allowed to stay in the country only for 12 years, and are forced to wear armbands at all times; Jews can only live in designated communities and are forbidden from usury. Through this, the Jewish community depends upon the king for their right to protection. 
 August – Louis X (the Quarrelsome) mobilizes an army along the Flemish border. He prohibits the export of grain and other goods to Flanders – which proves challenging to enforce. Louis pressures officers of the Church at the borderlands, as well as King Edward II, to support his effort to prevent Spanish merchant vessels from trading with the embargoed Flemish cities.
 August 29 – Battle of Montecatini: The Pisan army (some 20,000 men) led by Uguccione della Faggiuola defeats the allied forces of Florence and Naples. During the battle, Philip I manages to escape, but his son Charles of Taranto and his brother Peter Tempesta are killed.
 November 15 – Battle of Morgarten: The Swiss defeat Leopold of Austria on the shore of the Ägerisee, ensuring independence for the Swiss Confederation.
 December – Sultan Ismail I orders the Jews of Granada to wear the yellow badge in public.

 England 
 July 22 – Siege of Carlisle: Scottish forces led by King Robert I (the Bruce) besiege Carlisle Castle, but the stronghold holds out, due to a well-conducted defense organized by Andrew Harclay. After several unsuccessful attacks, Robert is forced to withdraw on August 1.McNamee, Colin (2010). Rogers, Clifford J. (ed.). The Oxford encyclopedia of medieval warfare and military technology, volume 1, pp. 127–128. Oxford University Press. .
 September – Battle of Moiry Pass: Scottish-Irish forces under Edward Bruce, brother of Robert I (the Bruce), defeat an Irish garrison at Moyry Pass, as part of his attempt to revive the High Kingship of Ireland. 
 October – Banastre Rebellion: A group of English knights start an uprising in Lancashire and revenge themselves on Thomas of Lancaster. After the rebellion, Liverpool Castle is granted to Robert de Holland.
 Autumn – Scottish forces under James Douglas (the Black) raid Copeland and plunder St. Bees Priory.

 Asia 
 August 11 – Hōjō Mototoki becomes ruler (shogun) and regent (shikken) of the Kamakura shogunate in Japan. 

 By topic 

 Cities and Towns 
 Cairo, capital of the Mamluk Sultanate becomes the largest city in the world, taking the lead from Hangzhou in Mongolian China (approximate date).
 Siegfried II, bishop of Hildesheim, provides Dassel in Lower Saxony, Germany with city rights.
 Vlissingen (or Flushing) in the Netherlands is granted city rights.

Births 
 January 20 – Yi Ja-chun, Korean nobleman and general (d. 1361)
 February 22 – Chunghye, Korean crown prince and king (d. 1344)
 April 5 – James III (the Unfortunate), king of Majorca (d. 1349)
 April 14 – Muhammad IV, Nasrid ruler (sultan) of Granada (d. 1333)
 May 4 – John Segrave, English nobleman and landowner (d. 1353)
 May 20 – Bonne of Luxembourg, queen consort of France (d. 1349)
 date unknown
 Albert IV, German nobleman (House of Ascania) (d. 1343)
 Federico di Pagana, Genoese nobleman and doge (d. 1406)
 Gi (or Qi), Chinese concubine and empress consort (d. 1369)
 James of Piedmont, Italian nobleman (House of Savoy) (d. 1367)
 Joanna of Hainault, French noblewoman and regent (d. 1374)
 Johann Hiltalinger, Swiss bishop, theologian and writer (d. 1392)
 John FitzWalter, English nobleman, knight and landowner (d. 1361)
 Kujō Michinori, Japanese nobleman (kugyō) and regent (d. 1349)
 Louis V, German nobleman, knight, prince and co-ruler (d. 1361)
 Marie de Bourbon, Latin princess (House of Bourbon) (d. 1387)
 Pierre d'Orgemont, French politician and chancellor (d. 1389)
 Raoul II of Brienne, French nobleman and constable (d. 1350)
 Roger Beauchamp, English nobleman and chamberlain (d. 1380)

Deaths 
 January 15 – Gyeguk, Korean queen consort of Goryeo (b. 1285)
 March 10 – Agnes Blannbekin, Austrian mystic and writer (b. 1244)
 April 30
 Enguerrand de Marigny, French Grand Chamberlain (b. 1260)
 Margaret of Burgundy, queen consort of France (b. 1290)
 May 1 – Margaret of Brandenburg, German noblewoman (b. 1270)
 May 9 – Hugh V, French nobleman (House of Burgundy) (b. 1294)
 June 27 – Mieszko I, Polish nobleman and knight (House of Piast)
 July 24 – Otto II, German nobleman and prince (House of Ascania)
 August 12 – Guy de Beauchamp, English nobleman and magnate
 August 18 – Hōjō Hirotoki, Japanese nobleman and regent (b. 1279)
 August 29 – (Battle of Montecatini)
 Charles of Taranto, Italian nobleman (House of Anjou) (b. 1296)
 Peter Tempesta (Storm), Italian nobleman and knight (b. 1291)
 August 31 – Andrea Dotti, Italian nobleman and preacher (b. 1256)
 November 24 – Fulk FitzWarin, English nobleman and landowner
 December 6 – William Greenfield, English rector and archbishop
 December 13 – Gaston I, Occitan nobleman and knight (b. 1287)
 date unknown
 Abu al-Ghayth ibn Abi Numayy, Hasanid ruler of Mecca
 Adolph VI, German nobleman, knight and ruler (b. 1256)
 Esclaramunda of Foix, queen consort of Majorca (b. 1250)
 Henry of Treviso, German hermit, pilgrim and saint (b. 1250)
 Ibn al-Raqqam, Andalusian astronomer and jurist (b. 1250)
 Jean Pitard, French physician, surgeon and writer (b. 1228)
 John I, French nobleman (House of Chalon-Arlay) (b. 1258)
 Juan Núñez II, Spanish nobleman (House of Lara) (b. 1276)
 Lanfranc of Milan, Italian cleric, surgeon and writer (b. 1250)
 Lu Zhi, Chinese official, politician, poet and writer (b. 1243)
 Margaret of Villehardouin, Latin noblewoman and princess
 Nichigen, Japanese Buddhist monk and disciple (b. 1262)
 Robert FitzPayne, English nobleman, knight and governor
 Stephen Ákos, Hungarian nobleman and oligarch (b. 1260)

References